The 2017–18 season is the 121st season of competitive football by Heart of Midlothian F.C. (Hearts) with the team participating in the Scottish Premiership. Hearts are playing their third consecutive season in the top tier of Scottish football, having been promoted from the Scottish Championship at the end of the 2014–15 season. They also competed in the League and Scottish Cup.

Results and fixtures

Friendlies
Hearts returned for pre-season training mid June, with the first preseason friendly taking place against Livingston  at the start of July. They then headed to Ireland for a five-day training camp in Dublin and Belfast.

Premiership

League Cup

Heart of Midlothian are part of Group B in the League Cup group stages. On 20 June, of the matches were announced by the Scottish Professional Football League with Hearts drawn in North Group B, alongside Dunfermline Athletic, Peterhead, East Fife and Elgin City.

Scottish Cup

First team player statistics

Captains
Returning defender and former captain Christophe Berra was re-appointed captain for season 2017–18. He took over from now former player Perry Kitchen.
{| class="wikitable" style="font-size: 95%; text-align: center;"
|-
! style="background:maroon; color:white;" scope="col" width=60|No
! style="background:maroon; color:white;" scope="col" width=60|Pos
! style="background:maroon; color:white;" scope="col" width=150|Name
! style="background:maroon; color:white;" scope="col" width=80|Country
! style="background:maroon; color:white;" scope="col" width=80|No of games
! style="background:maroon; color:white;" scope="col" width=80|Notes
|-
|6||DF||Berra||||44||Captain
|-
|5||DF||Hughes||||1||Vice Captain

Squad information
During the 2017–18 season, Hearts have used forty-two players in competitive games. The table below shows the number of appearances and goals scored by each player.
Last Updated 13 May 2018
{| class="wikitable" style="font-size: 100%; text-align: center;"
|-
! style="background:maroon; color:white; width:30px;" rowspan="2" | Number
! style="background:maroon; color:white; width:10%;" rowspan="2" | Position
! style="background:maroon; color:white; width:10%;" rowspan="2" | Nation
! style="background:maroon; color:white; width:20%;" rowspan="2" | Name
! style="background:maroon; color:white;" colspan="2" | Totals
! style="background:maroon; color:white;" colspan="2" | Premiership
! style="background:maroon; color:white;" colspan="2" | League Cup
! style="background:maroon; color:white;" colspan="2" | Scottish Cup
|-
! style="background:maroon; color:white; width:60px;" |Apps
! style="background:maroon; color:white; width:60px;" |Goals
! style="background:maroon; color:white; width:60px;" |Apps
! style="background:maroon; color:white; width:60px;" |Goals
! style="background:maroon; color:white; width:60px;" |Apps
! style="background:maroon; color:white; width:60px;" |Goals
! style="background:maroon; color:white; width:60px;" |Apps
! style="background:maroon; color:white; width:60px;" |Goals
|-

 

 

Appearances (starts and substitute appearances) and goals include those in Scottish Premiership, League Cup and the Scottish Cup.

Disciplinary record
During the 2017–18 season, Hearts players have been issued with one hundred and one yellow cards and four red. The table below shows the number of cards and type shown to each player. The red card issued to Esmaël Gonçalves during the game versus Kilmarnock on 12 August, for an incident with Kirk Broadfoot was rescinded on appeal, with a yellow card issued for simulation to Kyle Lafferty during the game versus Dundee on 1 April 2018, also rescinded.
Last updated 13 May 2018

Goal scorers
Last updated 13 May 2018

Clean sheets
{| class="wikitable" style="font-size: 95%; text-align: center;"
|-
! style="background:maroon; color:white;" scope="col" width=60|
! style="background:maroon; color:white;" scope="col" width=60|
! style="background:maroon; color:white;" scope="col" width=60|
! style="background:maroon; color:white;" scope="col" width=150|Name
! style="background:maroon; color:white;" scope="col" width=80|Premiership
! style="background:maroon; color:white;" scope="col" width=80|League Cup
! style="background:maroon; color:white;" scope="col" width=80|Scottish Cup
! style="background:maroon; color:white;" scope="col" width=80|Total
|-
|1
|GK
|
|Jon McLaughlin
|13
|0
|2
|15
|-
|2
|GK
|
|Jack Hamilton
|2
|2
|0
|4
|-
|3
|GK
|
|Viktor Noring
|0
|0
|0
|0
|-
! colspan=4 | Total
!16||2||2||19

Team statistics

League table

League Cup table

Division summary

Management statistics
Last updated on 13 May 2018

Club

Staff

|-

Management
Hearts began the season under the stewardship of head coach Ian Cathro, having signed a deal on his appointment until the end of the 2020–21 season. With Hearts having exited the League Cup at the group stages, and with four days until the league started, Hearts sacked Cathro on 1 August. Cathro had won only seven games out of thirty in all competitions since his appointment the previous season. Hearts under-20 coach Jon Daly was appointed interim manager the following day. He was assisted by assistant head coach Austin MacPhee and first team coach Liam Fox.

On 28 August, director of football Craig Levein was appointed as first team manager, with Jon Daly being promoted to first team coach alongside Liam Fox and Paul Gallacher, with Austin MacPhee remaining as assistant manager. As manager rather than head coach, Levein retained some of his role as director of football and his place on the board. He had previously managed Hearts between 2000 and 2004 and was awarded a three-year contract. Andy Kirk become the club's under 20's coach replacing Daly.

Stadium
The 2017–18 season Hearts will play in front of a new main stand. Construction began on the new stand during the 2016–17 season, with demolition of the listed 1914 Archibald Leitch main stand beginning on 15 May 2017. The new stand was expected to be partially open by September 2017.

On 3 August 2017, it was announced that the stand would be unable to open on schedule and as such a small number of games would need to be played at Murrayfield Stadium. This meant the opening of the stand would now be two months late, although the overall project would be delivered on time. During this time games against Aberdeen, St Johnstone and Rangers are to be played at Murrayfield, with a further fixture against Partick Thistle played away from home. The reasons for the delay included adverse weather and the club not processing the order of seating for the new stand on time.

Upon completion of the new main stand the ground will revert to its original name of Tynecastle Park. The stadium had been renamed Tynecastle Stadium during the 1990s.

Playing kit
Hearts kits were manufactured by Umbro for the 2017–18 season, ending the club's two-year association with Puma. The club's last association with Umbro ended with Hearts winning the 2012 Scottish Cup Final. The club's new home kit went on sale on 15 June, priced at £48.00 for an adults top with kids priced at £37.50. The kit recorded one of the highest ever sales at launch, with over 1,300 sold in 24 hours. The kit, a modern maroon version of an Umbro designed kit from 1977, was sponsored by charity Save the Children, as part of the three-year deal funded through philanthropy in 2015.

The away kit for the 2017–18 season is a two tone light blue top, with maroon shorts and light blue socks and features the cobbles from the Heart of Midlothian mosaic embossed into the fabric. The kit went on sale to the public on 7 July, at the same pricing. A third change kit was released on 10 August and features a dark blue top, shorts and socks, with a pink badge and trim.

Both the home and away kit have “This is our story, this is our song” embossed into the neck of the shirt. This is a reference to the main stand mosaic and Hearts song.

International selection
Over the course of the season a number of the Hearts squad were called up on international duty. Arnaud Djoum was called up to represent Cameroon, Aaron Hughes to represent Northern Ireland, Bjorn Johnsen to represent Norway and Jack Hamilton to represent Scotland and Nikolay Todorov was called up to represent Bulgaria at under-21 level.

In addition a number of the Hearts squad were called up to represent Scotland at youth level. Chris Hamilton and Marc Leonard were called up to the under-17 squad.

Deaths
The following players and people associated with the club died over the course of the season. Former defender Davie Laing, 1998 Scottish Cup winner Stefano Salvatori and former club physio Andy Stevenson.

Awards
The club's annual award ceremony took place on 9 April 2018, with club captain Christophe Berra winning both fans and players player of the year award. The full list of awards are included below.

Club awards

Transfers

Players in

Players out

Loans in

Loans out

See also
List of Heart of Midlothian F.C. seasons

Notes

References

2017-18
Scottish football clubs 2017–18 season